Shareef Abdul Miller (born March 14, 1997) is an American football outside linebacker for the Seattle Sea Dragons of the XFL. He played college football at Penn State and was drafted by the Philadelphia Eagles in the fourth round of the 2019 NFL Draft.

Early years
A 3 star recruit, Miller held offers from 26 different schools, including Florida, Miami FL, Nebraska, Oregon, and Tennessee among others. On January 25, 2015, he committed to Penn State.

College career

Professional career

Philadelphia Eagles
Miller was drafted by the Philadelphia Eagles in the fourth round (138th overall) of the 2019 NFL Draft. On September 5, 2020, Miller was waived by the Eagles before the start of the 2020 season.

Carolina Panthers
On September 6, 2020, Miller was claimed off waivers by the Carolina Panthers. He was waived on October 3, 2020.

Philadelphia Eagles (second stint)
The Philadelphia Eagles signed Miller to their practice squad on October 19, 2020. He was released on December 1, 2020.

Arizona Cardinals
On January 6, 2021, Miller signed a reserve/future contract with the Arizona Cardinals. He was waived on June 7, 2021.

Atlanta Falcons
On June 17, 2021, Miller signed with the Atlanta Falcons. On August 24, the Falcons released Miller.

New Orleans Breakers
On March 10, 2022, Miller was drafted by the New Orleans Breakers of the United States Football League. He was transferred to the team's inactive roster on May 12 with a hamstring injury. He was moved back to the active roster on May 21.

Seattle Sea Dragons
The Seattle Sea Dragons selected Miller in the fourth round of the 2023 XFL Supplemental Draft on January 1, 2023.

References

External links
Penn State bio

1997 births
Living people
Players of American football from Philadelphia
American football defensive ends
Penn State Nittany Lions football players
Philadelphia Eagles players
Carolina Panthers players
Arizona Cardinals players
Atlanta Falcons players
New Orleans Breakers (2022) players
Seattle Sea Dragons players